The R589 road is a regional road in Ireland which links Halfway and Bandon. The road passes through the village of Crossbarry.

See also 

 Roads in Ireland
 National primary road
 National secondary road

References 

Regional roads in the Republic of Ireland
Roads in County Cork